Edward Morrissey was a college professor who became a stage actor and then a film director. He taught French and German at the University of California, then became an actor in Shubert productions before assisting D.W. Griffith at Biograph and then directing his own films at Thanhouser.

Filmography
The Girl in the Shack (1914), short film
The House Built Upon Sand (1916)
Stage Struck (1917)
The Pointing Finger (1919) with Edward A. Kull also directing
Just Off Broadway (1920)

References

External links

Year of birth missing
Year of death missing
American film directors
University of California faculty